Maidens' Trip  is a 1948 autobiography by Emma Smith based on her experiences as a volunteer boatwoman on Britain's Grand Union Canal during the Second World War. It won the John Llewellyn Rhys Prize for 1949.

Background
In 1943 Emma Smith (then known as Elspeth Hallsmith) joined the Grand Union Canal Carrying Company under their wartime scheme of employing women to replace men who had gone off to fight. Freed from a middle-class background, Emma and her new workmates joined the boating fraternity and learned how to handle a pair of 72 ft long canal boats, carrying cargoes of steel and coal north from London to Birmingham and Coventry.

Radio and television
In 1968 Smith's book was serialised on the BBC's Woman's Hour and read by Miriam Margolyes.  A decade later it was adapted as a 3-part television serial, produced by the BBC (Birmingham) and broadcast in 1977. It starred Tina Heath, Liz Bagley, Tricia George and John Salthouse and was directed by Moira Armstrong.

References

1948 non-fiction books
British autobiographies
John Llewellyn Rhys Prize-winning works
G. P. Putnam's Sons books